The High Command of the Military of Bolivia entrusted General Celso Torrelio Villa with the Presidency on 4 September 1981, and on 7 September 1981 he formed his cabinet.

mil – military

ind – independent

MNR – Revolutionary Nationalist Movement

FSB – Bolivian Socialist Falange

ADN – Nationalist Democratic Action

PSC – Social Christian Party

Notes

Cabinets of Bolivia
Cabinets established in 1981
Cabinets disestablished in 1982